Christopher Zand Minkowski (born 13 May 1953) is an American academic, who has been Boden Professor of Sanskrit at the University of Oxford since 2005.

Education and early career
Minkowski was educated at Gilman School before studying English at Harvard College.  After receiving a diploma in Hindi from the University of Delhi in 1976, he returned to Harvard to obtain a master's degree, followed by a PhD in Sanskrit and Indian Studies in 1986.  Thereafter, he taught at the University of Iowa and Brown University before a research year (as a junior research fellow) at Wolfson College, Oxford.

Later career
Between 1989 and 2006, he taught at Cornell University, becoming Professor of Asian Studies and Classics. He was appointed Boden Professor of Sanskrit at the University of Oxford in 2005, a post that carries with it a professorial fellowship at Balliol College, Oxford.

His writings include Priesthood in Ancient India (1991) as well as articles on Vedic religion and literature and the modern intellectual history of southern Asia. He includes as one of his recreations "further adventures in the improbable".

References

External links
Minkowski's webpage at Oxford's Institute of Oriental Studies
Transcript of his inaugural lecture at Oxford

Living people
1953 births
American Indologists
Harvard College alumni
University of Iowa faculty
Brown University faculty
Fellows of Wolfson College, Oxford
Cornell University faculty
Boden Professors of Sanskrit
Fellows of Balliol College, Oxford